Bund, BUND, or the Bund may refer to:

Arts, entertainment, and media
 Der Bund, a German-language newspaper published in Bern, Switzerland
 Shanghai Bund (TV series), a 2007 Chinese television remake of the 1980 Hong Kong television series The Bund produced by TVB
 The Bund (TV series), a 1980 Hong Kong television series produced by TVB
 The Bund II, a 1980 Hong Kong television series produced by TVB
 The Bund III, a 1980–1981 Hong Kong television series produced by TVB
 The Bund, a fictional refuge for vampires in the manga series Dance in the Vampire Bund

Organizations 
 Bund: Gemeinschaft für ein sozialistisches Leben, a communitarian group of Germans resisting the Nazis, 1924–1968
 Bund für Umwelt und Naturschutz Deutschland or Friends of the Earth Germany, one of Germany's largest environmental protection organisations
 Communist League (Japan), a radical Marxist student group, nicknamed "The Bund"
 General Jewish Labour Bund in Lithuania, Poland and Russia, a political party founded in the Russian Empire
 General Jewish Labour Bund in Poland, a political party founded in Poland
 German American Bund, a pro-Nazi pre-World War II organization
 International Jewish Labor Bund, New York-based international Jewish socialist organization
 The Deutscher Bund (German Confederation), an association of 39 German-speaking states in Central Europe, created by the Congress of Vienna in 1815 to coordinate the economies of separate German-speaking countries

People with the name
 Károly Bund (1869–1931), Hungarian forestry engineer and early environmentalist
 Lisa Bund (born 1988), German pop singer

Places 
 Old Bund, a waterfront area in Ningbo, China
 The Bund, a waterfront area in Shanghai, China

Other uses 
 Bundesanleihe, German government-issued bonds, commonly referred to as "the Bund" or "Bunds"
 Bunding, a structure designed to prevent inundation or breaches in construction
 Bundism, a Jewish socialist and secular movement founded in the Russian Empire in 1897